Sedbergh Rural District was a rural district in the West Riding of Yorkshire in England from 1894 to its abolition in 1974. The district consisted of the three parishes of Sedbergh, Garsdale and Dent. In 1974 the district became part of the South Lakeland district in the new non-metropolitan county of Cumbria.

References

Rural districts of the West Riding of Yorkshire
History of Cumbria
Districts of England created by the Local Government Act 1894
Districts of England abolished by the Local Government Act 1972
Sedbergh